The Directorate of Fire and Emergency Services, Goa is the fire brigade run by the Government of Goa.

The department has 15 fire stations throughout Goa.

Bicholim
Canacona
Cuncolim
Curchorem
Kundaim
Mapusa
Margao
Old Goa
Panaji
Pernem
Pilerne
Ponda
Valpoi
Vasco da Gama
Verna

Several fire stations such as the one in Pernem and Ponda have been stated to be ill-equipped with only two fire tenders at each station.

In 2010, a proposal was made to allow women to become firefighters, which would have made Goa the first state in western India to do so.

In 2013, six Royal Enfield bikes were inducted into the fleet for fighting operations in congested areas. These bikes are equipped with fire extinguishers, wireless communication, sirens, and first aid kits.

A fire fighting trainer Fransisco Clemente, represents the department as an athlete. He is also representing India at the 2014 Lusophony Games in Goa in long distance running.

The directorate is the sole authority to issue a No Objection Certificate for fire safety. It allows people to register for issuing as well as filing incident reports on its website.

External links 
 Directorate of Fire and Emergency Services
 Directorate of Fire and Emergency Services - Live Calls

References 

State agencies of Goa
Fire departments of India
Year of establishment missing